Vitaperk LLC, often stylized VitaPerk, is a Michigan based, domestic limited liability company that produces and sells nutraceuticals and dietary supplements in the form of a fortified, non-dairy coffee additive.

VitaPerk's powdered supplement formula contains 15 vitamins and minerals:

 Vitamin C
 Vitamin D
 Vitamin E
 Vitamin B1
 Riboflavin
 Vitamin B3
 Vitamin B6
 Folic Acid
 Vitamin B12
 Biotin
 Vitamin B5
 Vitamin A
 Iodine
 Molybdenum
 Chromium

History
The concept for VitaPerk's powdered coffee supplement began in January 2010 as an attempted convergence of the coffee and nutritional supplement industries. The initial projected timeline from formulation to product launch was one year. However, due to production and formulation issues, the product was not available until early 2015.

During the summer of 2015, Brad Kifferstein appeared on CNBC's Power Pitch, where his pitch received one "in" and two "out" votes from the panelists.

References

American companies established in 2010
Companies based in Oakland County, Michigan
Privately held companies based in Michigan
Coffee preparation